The Monkey's Paw is a 1923 British silent horror film directed by Manning Haynes and starring Moore Marriott, Marie Ault, and Charles Ashton. It is an adaptation of W. W. Jacobs's 1902 short story "The Monkey's Paw". The short story was made into a 1907 one-act play by Louis N. Parker, elements of which were also incorporated into this 1923 British film by screenwriter Lydia Hayward.

Plot
As described in a film magazine review for an American audience, a traveler tells a family, John White, his wife, and son, weird tales of a magical talisman, a monkey's paw, which has the power of granting its possessor three wishes. The father falls asleep. In his dreams he acquires the paw and requests two thousand dollars. He gets the money but this results in the death of his son Herbert. His wife compels him to wish that her boy was alive again. This is accomplished, but when he appears as a soulless zombie, in his fright Mr. White makes his third and final wish that his son be dead once more, where he may hopefully rest in peace. Awakening, the father wants nothing to do with the magic charm.

Cast
 Moore Marriott as John White  
 Marie Ault as Mrs. White  
 Charles Ashton as Herbert White  
 Johnny Butt as Sergeant Tom Morris  
 A. B. Imeson 
 George Wynn
 Tom Coventry as Engine Driver

References

Bibliography
 Goble, Alan. The Complete Index to Literary Sources in Film. Walter de Gruyter, 1999.

External links

1923 films
1923 horror films
British silent feature films
British horror films
1920s English-language films
Films directed by H. Manning Haynes
Films based on short fiction
Films based on works by W. W. Jacobs
British black-and-white films
Silent horror films
1920s British films